Féli Petra Delacauw (born 4 April 2002) is a Belgian footballer who plays as a midfielder for Dutch club Fortuna Sittard in the Eredivisie and the Belgium national team.

International career
Delacauw made her debut for the Belgium national team on 21 February 2021, coming on as a substitute for Lenie Onzia against Germany.

References

External links
 
 

2002 births
Living people
Women's association football midfielders
Belgian women's footballers
Belgium women's international footballers
K.A.A. Gent (women) players
Super League Vrouwenvoetbal players
UEFA Women's Euro 2022 players
Belgium women's youth international footballers
Fortuna Sittard (women) players
Eredivisie (women) players